The Frænkelryggen Formation is a geologic formation in Svalbard, Norway. The fluvial sandstones and green shales preserve flora and early fish fossils dating back to the Lochkovian stage of the Early Devonian period.

Description 
Defined at the Frænkelryggen mountain by Kiaer in 1918, the formation was originally described as Silurian, later dating of the formation provided likely ages between 413.5 and 411 Ma, dating the formation to the Lochkovian stage of the Early Devonian. The formation belongs to the Red Bay Group, conformably overlying the Andréebreen Formation and overlain conformably by the Ben Nevis Formation.

The formation comprises sandstone and green shales deposited in a fluvial environment.

Fossil content 
The Frænkelryggen Formation has provided fossils of:

Vertebrates 

 Anglaspis insignis
 Dinaspidella robusta
 Poraspis brevis
 P. polaris
 Machairaspis sp.
 Waengsjoeaspis sp.

Flora 

 Calamospora nigrata
 Cyclogranisporites plicatus
 Emphanisporites minutus
 Granulatisporites muninensis
 Leiotriletes parvus
 Pachytheca cf. fasciculata
 Punctatisporites glabar
 ?Taeniocrada spitsbergensis
 Prototaxites sp.
 ?Zosterophyllum sp.
 Hostinella indet.

See also 
 List of fossiliferous stratigraphic units in Norway

References

Bibliography

Further reading 
 

Geologic formations of Norway
Devonian System of Europe
Devonian Norway
Lochkovian Stage
Sandstone formations
Shale formations
Fluvial deposits
Devonian northern paleotropical deposits
Paleontology in Norway
Geology of Svalbard